Yatiyanthota is a town in Kegalle District, in Sabaragamuwa Province, Sri Lanka.

Populated places in Sabaragamuwa Province